Destini Berhad is a Malaysian company that is involved in heavy industry, defence and oil and gas. This company was formed in 1991 under the name of Satang Jaya Sdn Bhd. At the beginning, this company involved in the business as a supplier of aviation tools and spare parts from Original Equipment Manufacturers (OEM) to Malaysian government especially for Malaysian Armed Forces. The company first time entry into Bursa Malaysia in December 2005 and in September 2011, Satang Jaya Sdn Bhd changed its name to Destini Berhad as a part of company expansions. Destiny Berhad consist of four divisions which is System Enhancement Resources & Technologies (SERT) for land systems, Destini Aviation for aerospace, Destini Armada for marine and Destini Oil Services for oil and gas.

History
In May 1998, Destini Berhad awarded long-term contract to provide MRO services for Royal Malaysian Air Force (RMAF) equipment under the RMAF Contractorization Programme introduced by MINDEF in 1998. In December 2012, Destini Berhad acquired a 51% stake in Singapore-based Vanguard Composite Engineering Pte Ltd. This marked as the first time Destini Berhad enters in marine industry.

By February 2012, Destini Berhad enters in automotive industry by acquiring a 50% stake in automotive supply, fabrication and service company System Enhancement Resources & Technologies Sdn Bhd (SERT). With this acquisition, Destini Berhad has manufactured and supplied military and commercial vehicles for various government agencies.

Destini Berhad enters in oil and gas industry in March 2013 by purchasing the Samudra Oil Services Sdn Bhd in a contract value RM80 million. This company now known as Destini Oil Services. In June 2015 Destini Berhad enters into aerospace business by acquiring a 80% stake in Safeair Technical Sdn Bhd and also formed the joint venture with UK-based Avia Technique Limited.

In November 2015, Destini Berhad subsidiary, Destini Shipbuilding and Engineering awarded a contract to build six New Generation Patrol Craft (NGPC) namely Bagan Datuk-class patrol vessel for Malaysian Maritime Enforcement Agency (MMEA). In November 2016, Destini Berhad subsidiary Halaman Optima inked a deal to supply six MD-530G light attack helicopter for Malaysian Army. In January 2017, Destini Berhad joint venture with THHE has won a contract to build three Tun Fatimah-class offshore patrol vessel for MMEA.

Divisions

System Enhancement Resources & Technologies (SERT)
This division incorporated in 2009. The main activities of this division is to fabricate, supply and maintenance, repair and overhaul (MRO) of military and commercial vehicles for various government agencies and commercial markets. SERT also manufactured trollies, wagons and road rail vehicles for the rail sector.

Destini Aviation
Provided MRO and Technical Line Maintenance Services for both military and commercial aircraft. Destini Aviation is the holding company of Destini Avia Technique, Safeair Technical, Destini Prima and Halaman Optima.

Destini Armada
Destini Armada focuses on marine and shipbuilding industry. The group of companies under this divisions includes Destini Shipbuilding and Engineering, Vanguarde, Techno Fibre Group and AMS.

Destini Oil Services
This fourth divisions is the oilfield service company that offers products and services in onshore and offshore exploration, development, production and workover programmes for the oil and gas sector. Besides that, Destini Oil Services also provided maintenance services to extend the life of producing wells.

Products and services
Source:

Land systems
Destini Trucks
Transportable Expandable Cabin (TEC)
GIRN Vehicle
Motor trolley
Bogie Rail Wagon
Bogie Ballast Hopper
Road Rail Vehicle (RRV)
Knuckle Coupler

Aerospace
Aircraft Maintenance, Repair, and Overhaul (MRO)

Marine
Vanguarde's Lifeboats
Vanguarde's Davit Systems
Vanguarde's twin cylinder, V type 4-stroke diesel outboard engine
Marine Fire Fighting Equipment's
Lifeboat Cylinders, Immersion Suits, Life Jackets
Fire Extinguishers, Fire Alarm System
Marine Gas Detection System
Fire Hoses, Couplings, Nozzels
Hydrant Valves, Rope Ladders
Marine Safety Equipment Supply
Pengalang-class boat
Bagan Datuk-class patrol vessel
Tun Fatimah-class offshore patrol vessel

Oil and gas
Onshore and Offshore service, exploration, development and production for the oil and gas sector

References

1991 establishments in Malaysia
Oil and gas companies of Malaysia
Defense companies of Malaysia
Shipbuilding companies of Malaysia
Engineering companies of Malaysia
Companies listed on Bursa Malaysia
Companies based in Shah Alam